Heinrich Hlasiwetz (7 April 1825 – 7 October 1875) was an  Austrian chemist born in Reichenberg, Bohemia.

Son of a pharmacist, he studied at the University of Jena, where his instructors included Johann Wolfgang Döbereiner (1780-1849), Heinrich Wilhelm Ferdinand Wackenroder (1798-1854) and Matthias Jakob Schleiden (1804-1881). Later he studied under Josef Redtenbacher (1810–1870) in Prague. In 1848 he earned the diploma of Magister Pharmacia, and during the following year received his doctorate in chemistry.

In 1849 he began work as an assistant to Friedrich Rochleder (1819-1874), later becoming an associate professor of chemistry at the University of Innsbruck (1854). In 1867 he became a professor at the Vienna University of Technology, where from 1869 he represented general and analytical chemistry.

During his career he largely worked with resins, tannins and protein compounds. Hlasiwetz is remembered for his chemical analysis of quercitrin, phloroglucinol, resorcinol and creosote.

Written works 
 Über das Quercitrin, 1859
 Über eine neue Säure aus dem Milchzucker, 1859.

Bibliography 

 
 
 Johannes Uray, Organische Chemie in chemischer Forschung und Lehre an österreichischen Universitäten zwischen 1840 und 1870. In: Bericht über den 25. Österreichischen Historikertag in St. Pölten 2008. St. Pölten 2010, S 402-427.

References
  biography at Allgemeine Deutsche Biographie.

1825 births
1875 deaths
Austrian chemists
Scientists from Liberec
Academic staff of the University of Innsbruck